Pashkaleh-ye Vosta (also Romanized as Pashkaleh-ye Vosţá) is a village in Cheshmeh Kabud Rural District, in the Central District of Harsin County, Kermanshah Province, Iran. At the 2006 census, its population was 33, in 7 families.

References 

Populated places in Harsin County